Kyle Stanger (born 7 January 1997) is a British actor.  He was one of over 900 children (including his sister Jade Stanger) who auditioned to star in Pooh's Heffalump Movie as the voice of Lumpy the Heffalump, or Heffridge Trompler Brompet Heffalump IV (4th), at the age of 5. He eventually won the role. His performance drew positive reviews, including Entertainment Weekly describing Lumpy as "irresistibly voiced by 8-year-old Brit Kyle Stanger" and New York Times critic Anita Gates's comment that "adults as well as children may fall in love with Lumpy, partly because he's a sort of roly-poly lavender baby elephant but even more because of the endearing voice and infectious laugh of Kyle Stanger, a very young Briton making his movie and voice-over debut."

He later returned in the sequel of sorts, Pooh's Heffalump Halloween Movie.

Filmography

References

External links

1997 births
Living people
21st-century English male actors
English male child actors
English male voice actors
Male actors from London
People from Wandsworth